Gim Myeong-ok (born October 9, 1957), better known by the stage name Na-mi, is a South Korean singer. She was considered a "superstar" and "icon" of Korean pop music in the 1980s and early 1990s.

Discography

Studio albums 

 I Loved You / I Like You (난 사랑했어요 / 좋아해) (1980)
 International Waiting Room / Always (국제선 대합실 /언제까지나) (1981)
 Na-mi '83 (1983)
 Na-mi Vol. 4 (1984)
 Overture (1987)
 I Won't Say a Thing / Is This Hate or Longing? (아무말 않으리 / 미움인지 그리움인지) (1989)
 Chameleon (1992)
 A Long Winter (1996)

Source:

Awards

References

South Korean women pop singers
People from Dongducheon
South Korean Buddhists
Living people

1957 births